Sarascelis is a genus of palp-footed spiders that was first described by Eugène Louis Simon in 1887.

Species
 it contains seven species, found only in Africa and Singapore:
Sarascelis chaperi Simon, 1887 (type) – Ivory Coast, Guinea-Bissau
Sarascelis junquai Jézéquel, 1964 – Ivory Coast
Sarascelis kilimandjari (Berland, 1920) – Tanzania
Sarascelis lamtoensis Jézéquel, 1964 – Ivory Coast, Ghana
Sarascelis luteipes Simon, 1887 – Congo, São Tomé and Príncipe
Sarascelis raffrayi Simon, 1893 – Singapore, India?
Sarascelis rebiereae Jézéquel, 1964 – Ivory Coast

See also
 List of Palpimanidae species

References

Araneomorphae genera
Palpimanidae
Spiders of Africa
Spiders of Asia